Almaz Nazimovich Fatikhov (born 1 May 1990) is a Russian football player. He plays for FC Balashikha.

Club career
He made his debut in the Russian Second Division for FC Oktan Perm on 24 April 2011 in a game against FC Akademiya Tolyatti.

He made his Russian Football National League debut for FC Shinnik Yaroslavl on 22 July 2017 in a game against FC Rotor Volgograd.

References

1990 births
Sportspeople from Perm, Russia
Living people
Russian footballers
Association football midfielders
Association football forwards
FC Shinnik Yaroslavl players
FC Sakhalin Yuzhno-Sakhalinsk players
FC Neftekhimik Nizhnekamsk players
FC Chita players
Russian First League players
Russian Second League players